This is a list of Pultenaea species accepted by the Australian Plant Census and Plants of the World Online as at June 2021:

 Pultenaea acerosa R.Br. ex Benth. – bristly bush-pea (S.A., Vic.)
 Pultenaea adunca Turcz. (W.A.)
 Pultenaea alea de Kok (N.S.W.)
 Pultenaea altissima F.Muell. ex Benth. – tall bush pea (N.S.W., Qld., Vic.)
 Pultenaea arida E.Pritz. (W.A.)
 Pultenaea aristata Sieber ex DC. – bearded bush-pea, prickly bush-pea (N.S.W.)
 Pultenaea aspalathoides Meisn. (W.A.)
 Pultenaea baeuerlenii F.Muell. – Budawangs bush-pea (N.S.W.)
 Pultenaea barbata C.R.P.Andrews (W.A.)
 Pultenaea benthamii F.Muell. – Bentham's bush-pea (N.S.W., Vic.)
 Pultenaea blakelyi Joy Thomps. – Blakely's bush-pea (N.S.W., Vic.)
 Pultenaea boormanii H.B.Will. (N.S.W.)
 Pultenaea borea de Kok (Qld.)
 Pultenaea brachyphylla Turcz. (W.A.)
 Pultenaea brachytropis Benth. (W.A.)
 Pultenaea bracteamajor de Kok (Qld.)
 Pultenaea bracteaminor de Kok (Qld.)
 Pultenaea calycina (Turcz.) Benth. (W.A.)
 Pultenaea calycina (Turcz.) Benth. subsp. calycina
 Pultenaea calycina subsp. proxena Orthia & Chappill
 Pultenaea campbellii Maiden & Betche (N.S.W.)
 Pultenaea canaliculata F.Muell. – coast bush-pea (S.A., Vic.)
 Pultenaea canescens A.Cunn. – plumed bush-pea (N.S.W.)
 Pultenaea capitellata Sieber ex DC. – hard-head bush-pea (N.S.W., A.C.T., Vic.)
 Pultenaea cinerascens Maiden & Betche (N.S.W.)
 Pultenaea costata H.B.Will. – ribbed bush-pea (Vic.)
 Pultenaea craigiana C.F.Wilkins, Orthia & Crisp (W.A.)
 Pultenaea cuneata Benth. (Qld., N.S.W.)
 Pultenaea daena Orthia & Chappill (W.A.)
 Pultenaea daltonii H.B.Will. - hoary bush-pea (Vic.)
 Pultenaea daphnoides J.C.Wendl. — large-leaf bush-pea, large-leaf bitter-pea (Qld., N.S.W., Vic., S.A., Tas.)
 Pultenaea dargilensis Corrick & N.G.Walsh (Vic.)
 Pultenaea densifolia F.Muell. – dense-leaved bush-pea (S.A., Vic.)
 Pultenaea dentata Labill. – clustered bush-pea (S.A., VIC., N.S.W., QLD., Tas.)
 Pultenaea divaricata H.B.Will. (N.S.W.)
 Pultenaea echinula Sieber ex DC. – curved bush-pea (N.S.W.)
 Pultenaea elachista (F.Muell.) Crisp (W.A., S.A.)
 Pultenaea elusa (J.D.Briggs & Crisp) de Kok – elusive bush-pea (N.S.W.)
 Pultenaea empetrifolia Meisn. (W.A.)
 Pultenaea ericifolia Benth. ex Lindl. (W.A.)
 Pultenaea euchila DC. (Qld., N.S.W.)
 Pultenaea fasciculata Benth. – alpine bush-pea, bundled bush-pea (N.S.W., Vic., Tas.)
 Pultenaea ferruginea Rudge – large bronze bush-pea (N.S.W.)
 Pultenaea flexilis Sm. – graceful bush-pea (N.S.W., Qld.)
 Pultenaea foliolosa A.Cunn. ex Benth. – small-leaf bush-pea (Qld., N.S.W., Vic.)
 Pultenaea glabra Benth. – smooth bush-pea (N.S.W.)
 Pultenaea graveolens Tate – scented bush-pea (Vic.)
 Pultenaea gunnii Benth. – golden bush-pea (Tas., Vic., N.S.W.)
 Pultenaea gunnii Benth. subsp. gunnii
 Pultenaea gunnii subsp. tuberculata Corrick
 Pultenaea hartmannii F.Muell. (N.S.W., Qld.)
 Pultenaea heterochila F.Muell. (W.A.)
 Pultenaea hispidula R.Br. ex Benth. – rusty bush-pea (N.S.W., Vic., S.A.)
 Pultenaea humilis Benth. ex Hook.f. – dwarf bush-pea (N.S.W., Vic., Tas.)
 Pultenaea indira Orthia & Crisp (W.A.)
 Pultenaea indira Orthia & Crisp subsp. indira
 Pultenaea indira subsp. monstrosita Orthia
 Pultenaea indira subsp. pudoides Orthia
 Pultenaea insularis J.Z.Weber (S.A.)
 Pultenaea involucrata Benth. (S.A.)
 Pultenaea juniperina Labill. – prickly bush-pea (N.S.W., A.C.T., Vic., Tas.)
 Pultenaea kraehenbuehlii P.J.Lang (S.A.)
 Pultenaea lapidosa Corrick – stony bush-pea (N.S.W., Vic.)
 Pultenaea largiflorens F.Muell. ex Benth. – twiggy bush-pea (N.S.W., Vic., S.A.)
 Pultenaea laxiflora Benth. – loose-flower bush-pea (S.A., N.S.W. A.C.T., Vic.)
 Pultenaea linophylla Schrad. & Wendl. – halo bush-pea (Qld., N.S.W., Vic.)
 Pultenaea luehmannii Maiden – thready bush-pea (Vic.)
 Pultenaea maidenii Reader – Maiden's bush-pea (Vic.)
 Pultenaea maritima de Kok – coastal bush-pea, coastal headland pea (N.S.W., Qld.)
 Pultenaea microphylla Sieber ex DC. (Qld., N.S.W., A.C.T., Vic.)
 Pultenaea millarii F.M.Bailey (Qld.)
 Pultanaea millarii var. angustifolia H.B.Will.
 Pultanaea millarii var. millarii F.M.Bailey
 Pultenaea mollis Lindl. – soft bush-pea, guinea flower bush pea (N.S.W., Vic., Tas.)
 Pultenaea muelleri Benth. – Mueller's bush-pea (Vic.)
 Pultenaea myrtoides A.Cunn. ex Benth. (N.S.W., Qld.)
 Pultenaea ochreata Meisn. (W.A.)
 Pultenaea paleacea Willd. – chaffy bush-pea (N.S.W., Qld.)
 Pultenaea parrisiae J.D.Briggs & Crisp – bantam bush-pea, Parris's bush-pea (N.S.W, Vic.)
 Pultenaea parviflora Sieber ex DC. – Sydney bush-pea (N.S.W.)
 Pultenaea patellifolia H.B.Will. – Mt Byron bush-pea (Vic.)
 Pultenaea pauciflora M.B.Scott – Narrogin pea (W.A.)
 Pultenaea pedunculata Hook. – matted bush-pea (S.A., N.S.W., Vic., Tas.)
 Pultenaea penna de Kok – feather bush-pea (Vic., S.A.)
 Pultenaea petiolaris A.Cunn. ex Benth. – woolly bush-pea (Qld., N.S.W.)
 Pultenaea pinifolia Meisn. (W.A.)
 Pultenaea platyphylla N.A.Wakef. – flat-leaf bush-pea (N.S.W., Vic.)
 Pultenaea polifolia A.Cunn. – dusky bush-pea (N.S.W., A.C.T., Vic.)
 Pultenaea procumbens A.Cunn. - heathy bush-pea (N.S.W., A.C.T., Vic.)
 Pultenaea prolifera H.B.Will. – Otway bush-pea (Vic.)
 Pultenaea prostrata Benth. ex Hook.f. (Vic., S.A., Tas.)
 Pultenaea purpurea (Turcz.) Crisp & Orthia (W.A.)
 Pultenaea pycnocephala F.Muell. ex Benth. (N.S.W., Qld.)
 Pultenaea radiata H.B.Will. (W.A.)
 Pultenaea rariflora de Kok (Qld.)
 Pultenaea reflexifolia (J.H.Willis) de Kok – wombat bush-pea (Vic.)
 Pultenaea reticulata (Sm.) Benth. (W.A.)
 Pultenaea retusa Sm. – notched bush-pea (Qld., N.S.W., Vic.)
 Pultenaea rigida Benth. (S.A.)
 Pultenaea robusta (H.B.Will) de Kok (N.S.W., Qld.)
 Pultenaea rodwayi Tindale ex de Kok (N.S.W.)
 Pultenaea rosmarinifolia Lindl. – rosemary bush-pea (N.S.W)
 Pultenaea rostrata de Kok (N.S.W., Qld.)
 Pultenaea rotundifolia (Turcz.) Benth. (W.A.)
 Pultenaea scabra R.Br. – rough bush-pea (S.A., Qld., N.S.W., Vic.)
 Pultenaea sericea (Benth.) Corrick – chaffy bush-pea (N.S.W., Vic., Tas.)
 Pultenaea setulosa Benth. (Qld.)
 Pultenaea skinneri F.Muell. – Skinner's pea (W.A.)
 Pultenaea spinosa (DC.) H.B.Will. (Qld., N.S.W., A.C.T., Vic.)
 Pultenaea spinulosa (Turcz.) Benth. (W.A.)
 Pultenaea stipularis Sm. – handsome bush-pea (N.S.W.)
 Pultenaea stricta Sims – rigid bush-pea (Vic., S.A., Tas.)
 Pultenaea strobilifera Meisn. (W.A.)
 Pultenaea subalpina (F.Muell.) Druce – rosy bush-pea (Vic.)
 Pultenaea subspicata Benth. – low bush-pea (N.S.W., A.C.T., Vic.)
 Pultenaea subternata H.B.Will. (N.S.W.)
 Pultenaea tarik de Kok (N.S.W.)
 Pultenaea tenella Benth. – delicate bush-pea (N.S.W., Vic.)
 Pultenaea tenuifolia R.Br. & Sims – slender bush-pea (W.A., S.A., Vic. Tas.)
 Pultenaea trichophylla H.B.Will. ex J.M.Black – tufted bush-pea (S.A.)
 Pultenaea trifida J.M.Black – Kangaroo Island bush-pea (S.A.)
 Pultenaea trinervis J.M.Black – three-nerved bush-pea (S.A.)
 Pultenaea tuberculata Pers. – wreath bush-pea (N.S.W.)
 Pultenaea verruculosa Turcz. (W.A.)
 Pultenaea vestita R.Br. (W.A., S.A.)
 Pultenaea victoriensis Corrick (Vic.)
 Pultenaea villifera Sieber ex DC. (N.S.W., S.A.)
 Pultenaea villifera var. glabrescens J.M.Black (S.A.) – yellow bush-pea
 'Pultenaea villifera Sieber ex DC. var. villifera (N.S.W.)
 Pultenaea villosa Willd. (Qld., N.S.W.)
 Pultenaea viscidula Tate (S.A.)
 Pultenaea viscosa R.Br. ex Benth. (N.S.W.)
 Pultenaea vrolandii Maiden (N.S.W., Vic.)
 Pultenaea weindorferi Reader (Vic.) – swamp bush-pea
 Pultenaea whiteana S.T.Blake (Qld.)
 Pultenaea williamsoniana J.H.Willis (Vic.)
 Pultenaea wudjariensis'' Orthia (W.A.)

References

Pultenaea species
Pultenaea